Ann-Catrin Kjerr (born 14 February 1949) is a Swedish curler.

She competed at the 1992 Winter Olympics when curling was a demonstration sport.

In 1988 she was inducted into the Swedish Curling Hall of Fame.

Teams

References

External links

Living people
1949 births
People from Sundbyberg Municipality
Swedish female curlers
Swedish curling champions
Curlers at the 1992 Winter Olympics
Olympic curlers of Sweden